Jean-Claude Caron (14 February 1944 – 5 June 2021) was a French actor. He was best known for his role as Borelli in the series Navarro.

Biography
From 1994 to 2005, he appeared in the series Navarro.

Jean-Claude Caron died in Aujols on 5 June 2021 at the age of 77.

Filmography
Manon Roland (1989)
Le Pitre (1990)
 (1993)
Navarro (1994–2005)
 (1997)
 (1997–1999)
Potlatch (2010)
Section de recherches (2012)
Josephine, Guardian Angel (2013)
Lalla Fadhma N'Soumer (2013)

References

1944 births
2021 deaths
20th-century French male actors
21st-century French male actors
French male film actors
French male television actors